The reclamation of land from the ocean has long been used in mountainous Hong Kong to expand the limited supply of usable land with a total of around 60 square kilometres of land created by 1996. The first reclamations can be traced back to the early Western Han Dynasty (206 BC – 9 AD), when beaches were turned into fields for salt production. Major land reclamation projects have been conducted since the mid-19th century.

Projects

Bonham Strand

Praya Reclamation Scheme (1868-1904)

One of the earliest projects, the works were completed in two phases. It was one of the most ambitious projects ever undertaken during the Colonial Hong Kong era. It significantly expanded the land around Praya Central.

Praya East Reclamation Scheme (1921-1931)

Kai Tak Airport extension (1957-1974)

The old airport, Kai Tak, was located In Kowloon and part of the land is reclaimed. A section of runway and most parking stands were built on reclaimed land.

New towns, phases 1-3 (1973-1996)

The new towns were mostly built on reclaimed land, such as Tuen Mun, Tai Po, Sha Tin, Ma On Shan, West Kowloon, Kwun Tong and Tseung Kwan O. These were built in a series of three phases.

New International Airport construction (1991-1998)

The "new" airport, Chek Lap Kok International airport was built on two islands and was opened in 1998. Land was reclaimed to build a third runway and extend the current Terminal 2 in the airport.

Central and Wan Chai projects (1993-2018)

Several projects in and around Victoria Harbour, constructed for various purposes. This includes transportation improvements such as the Hong Kong MTR Station, Airport Express Railway & Central-Wanchai Bypass, as well as public recreation space such as the Central Harbourfront Event Space, Tamar Park and the Hong Kong Observation Wheel.

Disneyland construction (2003-2005)

Hong Kong-Zhuhai-Macau Bridge (2009-2018)

The bridge project involved the creation of four islands, including one in Hong Kong.

Tung Chung New Town Extension (2017- )

Currently under construction, an expansion of Tung Chung on the north shore of Lantau island. The project is expected to be completed in 2023.

Hong Kong International Airport Third Runway (2016-2024) 

The third runway and the extension of Terminal 2 in the Hong Kong International Airport is built on reclaimed land.

Lantau Tomorrow Vision (planned)

In October 2018, a development project was announced with the intention of creating 1700 hectares of land in the form of new islands off the east coast of Lantau, to house an estimated 1.1 million people. The project has an estimated cost of 500 billion Hong Kong dollars,

Issues
Much reclamation has taken place in prime locations on the waterfront on both sides of Victoria Harbour. This has raised environmental issues of the protection of the harbour which was once the source of prosperity of Hong Kong, traffic congestion in the Central district, as well as the collusion of the Hong Kong Government with the real estate developers in the territory.

Environmental legislation
Hong Kong legislators passed the Protection of the Harbour Ordinance in 1996 in an effort to safeguard the increasingly threatened Victoria Harbour against encroaching land development. In a judicial review in January 2004, the Court of Final Appeal stipulated an "overriding public need" test which the government must adhere in order to carry out reclamation at Victoria Harbour.

Gallery

See also
 Land reclamations of the People's Republic of China
 Society for Protection of the Harbour

References

External links

 Enhancing Land Supply Strategy
 Reclamation History
 Maps of the reclamations
 Detailed list of historical land reclamation projects in Hong Kong 
 Chen Yu, "Transformation of waterfront space in Asian cities: Macau, Hong Kong, Shanghai", National University of Singapore, 2009
 "Enhancing Land Supply Strategy: Reclamation Outside Victoria Harbour and Rock Cavern Development"

Land reclamation
Geography of Hong Kong
Coastal construction in Hong Kong